Normand Corbeil (April 6, 1956 – January 25, 2013) was a Canadian composer known for his work on films, video games and television.

Biography
Corbeil won a BAFTA Award and an Academy of Interactive Arts & Sciences award for composing the soundtrack for the 2010 PlayStation 3 video game, Heavy Rain. He also composed for the 2005 game, Fahrenheit, also known as Indigo Prophecy. The game Beyond: Two Souls is the last soundtrack that Corbeil composed, but he was unable to finish it before his death. For that reason, the game is dedicated to him.

Corbeil composed music for television and film. His credits included the films Double Jeopardy in 1999, Extreme Ops in 2002, and The Statement in 2003, as well as the short film, Kara. His television work included the 2009 ABC television series, V. He received two Emmy Award nominations for his compositions.

Death
Corbeil, who was diagnosed with pancreatic cancer in August 2012, died on January 25, 2013, at the age of 56.

Scores

Film (English-language)
 Penfield (1991)
 Kids of the Round Table (1995)
 Screamers (1995)
 Frankenstein And Me (1996)
 Never Too Late (1996)
 Les Boys (1997)
 The Kid (1997)
 The Assignment (1997)
 Airspeed (1998)
 Escape from Wildcat Canyon (1998)
 Twist of Fate (1998)
 Double Jeopardy (1999)
 The Art of War (2000)
 Pretty When You Cry (2001)
 Extreme Ops (2002)
 Talking to Heaven (2002)
 Lost Junction (2003)
 The Statement (2003)
 The Contract (2006)

Television
 Living with the Dead (2002)
 Hitler: The Rise of Evil (2003)
 The Pentagon Papers (2003)
 Defending Our Kids : The Julie Posey Story (2003)
 Frankenstein (2004)
 Lies My Mother Told Me (2005)
 Human Trafficking (2005)
 The Last Templar (2008)
 Vertige (2012)

Video games
 Fahrenheit (2005)
 Heavy Rain (2010)
 Beyond: Two Souls (unfinished due to his death; completed by Lorne Balfe; 2013)

References

External links

1956 births
2013 deaths
Canadian male composers
Canadian television composers
Video game composers
Canadian film score composers
Male film score composers
BAFTA winners (people)
21st-century Canadian composers
20th-century Canadian composers
Musicians from Montreal
Deaths from cancer in Quebec
Place of birth missing
Deaths from pancreatic cancer
Best Original Score Genie and Canadian Screen Award winners
20th-century Canadian male musicians
21st-century Canadian male musicians
Varèse Sarabande Records artists